Gregory Joseph Lens (March 11, 1945 – November 18, 2009) was an American football defensive tackle. 

Lens was born in Marshall, Minnesota, in 1945 and attended Central Catholic High School in Marshall. He played college football at Trinity University in San Antonio and was selected by the St. Louis Cardinals in the fourth round (86th overall pick) of the 1970 NFL Draft. He appeared in 21 games for the Atlanta Falcons, 14 of them as a starter, during the 1970 and 1971 seasons. He also played for the New York Stars and Charlotte Hornets of the World Football League during the 1974 and 1975 seasons. 

Lens was inducted into the Trinity University Hall of Fame in 2007. He died in 2009.

References

1945 births
2009 deaths
American football defensive tackles
Atlanta Falcons players
Charlotte Hornets (WFL) players
New York Stars players
Trinity Tigers football players
People from Marshall, Minnesota
Players of American football from Minnesota